Borsig is a surname. Notable people with the surname include:

  (1867–1897), German entrepreneur
 August Borsig (1804–1854), German businessman 
 Conrad von Borsig (1873–1945), German mechanical engineer
 Ernst Borsig (1869–1933), German industrialist